Nhyira FM is a privately owned radio station in Kumasi, the Ashanti Region of Ghana.

The station is owned and run by the media group company Multimedia Group Limited. The word Nhyira is a Twi word meaning blessing.

References

Radio stations in Ghana
Mass media in Kumasi